is a rural district located in Yamagata Prefecture, Japan.
As of December 2013, the district had an estimated population of 40,662³ and an area of 324.5 km³. All of the city of Nan'yō and parts of the cities of Yonezawa, Nagai, Kaminoyama were formerly part of Nishiokitami District.

Towns and villages
Kawanishi
Takahata

History
Okitami County was an ancient place name in part of Dewa Province. Under the Tokugawa shogunate, the portion which became Higashiokitami district consisted of 113 villages entirely within the area controlled by Yonezawa Domain. The area was designated Yonezawa Prefecture in August 1871, renamed Okitami Prefecture in December 1871, and became part of Yamagata Prefecture in 1876. Higashiokitami District was created on November 1, 1878. With the establishment of the municipalities system on April 1, 1889, it was organized into one town (Miyauchi) and 19 villages.

 On October 22, 1890 Komatsu was raised to town status 
 On December 12, 1895 Takahata and Akayu were raised to town status
 On October 1, 1954 Shago was raised to town status 
 On January 1, 1955 Komatsu merges with four neighboring villages to become the town of Kawanishi.
 On February 1, 1955 Miyauchi was raised to town status
On April 1, 1955 Shago was absorbed into Takahata.
On April 1, 1967 Miyauchi and Akayu merge to form the city of Nanyo.

Districts in Yamagata Prefecture